Dating Fever (Chinese: 我為相親狂) is a 2013 Chinese romantic comedy film directed by Han Jing.

Reception
On Film Business Asia, Derek Elley gave the film a grade of 6 out of 10, calling it a "frothy slice of throwaway rom-com fun" with "a lively young cast".

References

External links
 

2013 romantic comedy films
2013 films
Chinese romantic comedy films